Sunouchi (written: 簾内 or 洲之内) is a Japanese surname. Notable people with the surname include:

, Japanese mathematician
, Japanese swimmer

Japanese-language surnames